Peter Nigel Fluck (born 7 April 1941) is a British caricaturist and one half of the partnership known as Luck and Flaw (with Roger Law), creators of the popular satirical TV puppet show Spitting Image.

He attended Cambridgeshire High School for Boys, a grammar school, then Cambridge School of Art (now part of Anglia Ruskin University).

Fluck taught art in the 1970s at the Colchester School of Art in Colchester, Essex.
After Spitting Image finished its run, he moved to Cornwall to work as an artist.

He married Anne-Cécile de Bruyne in 1963 in Cambridge. They have a daughter and a son. He lives in Cadgwith, Cornwall.

References

External links
 Peter Fluck's website

1941 births
Living people
Alumni of Anglia Ruskin University
Artists from Cambridge
Artists from Cornwall
English caricaturists
English satirists
English sculptors
English male sculptors
Spitting Image
British republicans